Stephen Coleman (born January 29, 1973) is an American film orchestrator and conductor. He collaborated with Ramin Djawadi on the Person of Interest soundtrack, and conducted and orchestrated the score of The Predator (composed  by Henry Jackman). In 1994, Coleman received a bachelor's degree in Music Composition from New York's Manhattan School of Music. Stephen Coleman has a spouse, Allison Chase Coleman, and a daughter, youth actress Chloe Coleman (Big Little Lies, Gunpowder Milkshake).

References

External links 
 
 Stephen Coleman's Official Website
 
 []

1973 births
American film score composers
American male film score composers
Living people
People from Greater Los Angeles